Scrobipalpa dagmaris is a moth in the family Gelechiidae. It was described by Povolný in 1987. It is found in Uzbekistan, Turkmenistan and Mongolia. Although the type location is northern Italy, the species is probably not found in Europe. The type location was probably mistakenly given as Italy.

The ground colour of the forewings is brownish with well defined blackish markings. The hindwings are dirty whitish, with greyish margins.

The larvae feed on Haloxylon persicum.

References

Scrobipalpa
Moths described in 1987